The House of Catargiu is the name of an old and influential Moldavian noble family of the Tupilați region, whose members played important political role in the history of Wallachia, Moldavia and Romania.

Notable members 
 Alexandru Ștefan Catargiu (18251897), a Romanian politician 
 Barbu Catargiu (18071862), a conservative Romanian journalist and politician
 Lascăr Catargiu (18231899), a Romanian conservative statesman from Moldavia
 Nicolae Calimachi-Catargiu (18301882), a conservative Romanian politician
 Elena Maria Catargiu-Obrenović (18311879), mother of King Milan I of Serbia

See also 
 Catargiu River, a tributary of the Jijioara River in Romania

References 

Moldavian families
Romanian families
Romanian-language surnames